General elections were held in Western Samoa on 1 November 1944.

Electoral system
Two Europeans were elected from a single two-seat constituency. Voting was restricted to European and mixed European-Samoans aged 21 or over.

Results

Nominated members
Tualaulelei Mauri, appointed to the Council in 1943 retained his place on the Council.

Savea Ioane, Pulepule Tu'i and Meleisea Felise were all appointed to the Council in October 1945.

References

Western Samoa
General
Elections in Samoa